Clarion County Career Center is a part-time vocational center in central Clarion County, Pennsylvania, United States. It employs a faculty of 15 to teach trades or specific subjects, including remedial math, to students from seven Clarion County public high schools. It also runs night classes for adults. The center is overseen by a Joint Operating Committee, composed of school board members from each school district.

History
The idea to establish a technical school was a common idea among school administrators and board members in Clarion County in the early 1970s, but it was impossible for one sole district to put the idea to fruition. The school opened in 1976 to students in grades 10–12 in the Allegheny-Clarion Valley, Clarion Area, Keystone and Redbank Valley school districts. Subsequently three other county school districts – Clarion-Limestone, Union and North Clarion – opted to become participating districts in the Clarion County Career Center. The Allied Health Nursing Program was added in 1981, as well as other adult education programs. The Career Center was adequately renovated and structural additions were made at the beginning of the twenty-first century and were ready for the 2003–04 school term.

Sending school districts

High school programs
There are 9 programs of study at the Career Center. 
Allied Health Services
Automotive Technology
Construction Technology
Cosmetology Styling Academy
Culinary Arts
Diesel Technology
Information Technology
Police Science
Welding and Fabrication\

Adult education
CCCC offers a plethora of adult Education  opportunities such as Cake Decorating, Pharmacy Technician, Security Officer and Vehicle Inspection Agent.

Nursing program
A Licensed Practical Nursing program is available to both high school and adult students, which began in 1981; the program is licensed by the Pennsylvania State Board of Nursing; the program is located in a separate building, adjacent to the career center.

References

Schools in Clarion County, Pennsylvania
Public high schools in Pennsylvania
1976 establishments in Pennsylvania